NGC 714 is a lenticular galaxy located 190 million light-years away in the constellation Andromeda. The galaxy was discovered by astronomer Bindon Blood Stoney on October 28, 1850 and is a member of Abell 262.

See also
 List of NGC objects (1–1000)

References

External links

714
7009
Andromeda (constellation)
Astronomical objects discovered in 1850
Lenticular galaxies
Abell 262
1358
Discoveries by Bindon Blood Stoney